Florian Graf (born 24 July 1988) is a retired German biathlete. He has won several medals at Junior World Championships, including two gold medals.

Biathlon results
All results are sourced from the International Biathlon Union.

World Championships

*During Olympic seasons competitions are only held for those events not included in the Olympic program.

Junior/Youth World Championships
7 medals (2 gold, 3 silver, 2 bronze)

References

External links
 

1988 births
Living people
German male biathletes
People from Freyung-Grafenau
Sportspeople from Lower Bavaria